Glechon is a genus of flowering plants in the mint family, Lamiaceae, first described in 1827. It is native to South America.

Species
Glechon ciliata Benth. - southern Brazil, northern Argentina, Paraguay, Uruguay
Glechon discolor Epling - southern Brazil
Glechon elliptica C.Pereira & Hatschbach - Paraná
Glechon hoehneana Epling - southern Brazil
Glechon marifolia Benth. - southern Brazil, Misiones Province of Argentina, Paraguay, Uruguay
Glechon spathulata Benth. - southern Brazil, Misiones Province of Argentina
Glechon thymoides Spreng. - southern Brazil, Misiones Province of Argentina, Uruguay

References

Lamiaceae
Lamiaceae genera